Gloria Tramontin Struck (born July 7, 1925) is an American motorcyclist who was one of the early members of the Motor Maids women's motorcycle club, which she joined in 1946, at age 21. She is both a Sturgis Hall of Fame and Motorcycle Hall of Fame inductee.

Struck was born in a room behind her parents' Clifton, New Jersey motorcycle shop in 1925. She has ridden motorcycles since age 16, and has engaged in several long-distance motorcycling journeys through all 48 of the contiguous U.S. states. Her first solo motorcycle tour, in Canada in 1950, was the subject of a feature story in a 1952 issue of Harley-Davidson Enthusiast. She has frequently ridden to distant rallies for Motor Maids and the national Sturgis Motorcycle Rally into her late 80s, for which she spurns trailering. She estimates a lifetime  riding on eleven Harley-Davidsons and three Indian Motorcycles she has owned, and went on motorcycle tours in Europe starting in her 70s.

Struck was named to the Sturgis Hall of Fame in 2011, and to the AMA Motorcycle Hall of Fame in 2016.

Bibliography

References

Sources 

 

1925 births
Living people
Long-distance motorcycle riders
People from Clifton, New Jersey
Sturgis Motorcycle Rally people
Women motorcyclists